E. Claiborne Robins Stadium is an 8,217-seat multi-purpose stadium at the University of Richmond in Richmond, Virginia. It is home to the Richmond Spiders football, men's lacrosse, women's lacrosse, women's soccer, and women's track and field teams. The men's soccer team played there until 2012, when the university discontinued the program.

History
Known for many years as the Soccer/Track Complex, the original 2,000-seat facility was renamed First Market Stadium in 2001 following a sponsorship from First Market Bank (now Atlantic Union Bank).

In 2002, the stadium's track was completely rebuilt. In 2003, it was named the Fred Hardy Track in honor of the longtime Spiders coach. The playing surface was changed from natural grass to FieldTurf, an artificial turf, in 2004.

Due to the age and off-campus location of City Stadium, where the Richmond Spiders football team played its home games, demand grew for an on-campus football facility.

The university and donors committed more than $25 million to a renovation of First Market Stadium, including a $5 million grant from the Robins Foundation in early 2008.

Renovations on the stadium began on December 20, 2008, coincidentally the day after the Spiders football team won the 2008 NCAA Division I Football Championship – the school's first national title in any sport.

On September 16, 2009, the stadium was renamed E. Claiborne Robins Stadium to honor the legacy of E. Claiborne Robins Sr and his historic philanthropy to the school.

The football team began play at Robins Stadium in the 2010 season, they won their first game 27-21 in overtime over Elon University.

Attendance records

See also
 List of NCAA Division I FCS football stadiums

References

College football venues
College lacrosse venues in the United States
College soccer venues in the United States
Richmond Spiders football
Richmond Spiders men's soccer
American football venues in Virginia
Lacrosse venues in the United States
Multi-purpose stadiums in the United States
Soccer venues in Virginia
Sports venues completed in 2010
2010 establishments in Virginia